Meusisha is a rural locality (a selo) in Dakhadayevsky District, Republic of Dagestan, Russia. The population was 1,375 as of 2010. There are 16 streets.

Geography
Meusisha is located 7 km northwest of Urkarakh (the district's administrative centre) by road. Kishcha and Urkarakh are the nearest rural localities.

Nationalities 
Dargins live there.

References 

Rural localities in Dakhadayevsky District